The Leo Ellis Post #22, American Legion Building is a historic American Legion building located at 804 Grant St. in Princeton, Mercer County, Missouri.  It was built in 1935, and is a rectangular reinforced concrete structure faced in brick.  It measures 30 feet by 32 feet, and features a crenelated parapet is capped by pre-formed concrete blocks.

It was added to the National Register of Historic Places in 1996.

References

American Legion buildings
Clubhouses on the National Register of Historic Places in Missouri
Buildings and structures completed in 1935
Buildings and structures in Mercer County, Missouri
National Register of Historic Places in Mercer County, Missouri